Agona Swedru is a town and the capital of Agona West Municipal District, a district in the Central Region of south Ghana. Agona Swedru has a 2013 settlement population of about 70,000 people.

Akwambo is the main festival celebrated by the people of Agona Swedru.

See also
Agona West Municipal District
Central Region

References

External links
Agona West Municipal District website
 		 	

Populated places in the Central Region (Ghana)